Prostitution in Korea can refer to:
Prostitution in North Korea
Prostitution in South Korea